"What I Did for Love" is a song from the musical A Chorus Line (music by Marvin Hamlisch, lyrics by Edward Kleban). It was quickly recognized for its show-business potential outside Broadway and was picked up by popular singers to include in their performances in their club and television appearances. Both female and male singers have made it an inclusion in their recorded albums to great effect. The Daily Telegraph described it as a "big anthem".

Synopsis within A Chorus Line
In the penultimate scene of the production, one of the dancers, Paul San Marco, has suffered a career-ending injury. The remaining dancers, gathered together onstage, are asked what they would do if they were told they could no longer dance. Diana, in reply, sings this anthem, which considers loss philosophically, with an undefeated optimism; all the other dancers concur. Whatever happens, they will be free of regret. What they did in their careers, they did for love, and their talent, no matter how great, was only theirs "to borrow," was to be only temporary and would someday be gone. However, the love of performing is never gone, and they are all pointed toward tomorrow.

Notable versions
Beverly Bremers' version, was released as a single in 1975.
Eydie Gormé - a single release in 1976 (US AC #23).
Bing Crosby - for his album Beautiful Memories (1977)
Engelbert Humperdinck - for his album Miracles (1977).
Grace Jones - for her debut album Portfolio (1977)
Aretha Franklin - for her album Sweet Passion (1977)
Jack Jones - in his 1975 album What I Did for Love  (US AC #25, Canada AC #23).
Johnny Mathis - Feelings (1975)
Bill Hayes - for his album From Me To You With Love (1976)
Marcia Hines - see below
Peggy Lee - for her album Peggy (1977)
Petula Clark - a single release in 1975.
Shirley Bassey - Love, Life and Feelings (1976)
Robert Goulet - in his album You're Something Special (1978).
Elaine Paige - included in her album Stages (1983)
Howard Keel - for his album Just for You (1988).
Josh Groban - for his album Stages (2015)
Me First and the Gimme Gimmes - from their album Are a Drag (1999)

Marcia Hines' version

Marcia Hines recorded and released a version as the lead single from her third studio album, Ladies and Gentlemen (1977). The song peaked at number 6 on the Kent Music Report, becoming Hines' third top 10 single in Australia.

At the 1978 Australian Record Awards, the song won Hines Female Vocalist of the Year.

Track listing
 7" Single (MS-507)
Side A "What I Did for Love" - 3:15
Side B "A Love Story" (Robie Porter) - 3:31

Charts

Weekly charts

Year-end charts

References

Songs from A Chorus Line
1975 songs
1975 singles
1977 singles
Marcia Hines songs
Beverly Bremers songs
Columbia Records singles
Grace Jones songs
Songs written by Marvin Hamlisch